Ross Prairie State Forest is a 3,527-acre state forest in Marion County, Florida. The conservation land was acquired in 1995 through the Conservation and Recreation Lands (CARL) with funds from the Preservation 2000 Act. It includes hiking and horseback trails. There is also a trailhead for the Cross Florida Greenway.

See also
List of Florida state forests

References

External links
 Ross Prairie State Forest - official site
 U.S. Geological Survey Map at the U.S. Geological Survey Map Website. Retrieved January 13, 2023.
 Ross Prairie State Forest Map - official map

Florida state forests
Protected areas of Marion County, Florida